Walt Curtis (born July 4, 1941) is a poet, novelist and painter from Portland, Oregon. His autobiographical work, Mala Noche (1977), became the basis for Gus Van Sant's 1985 film of the same name.  He was the co-founder of the Oregon Cultural Heritage Commission. He has hosted the poetry radio show "Talking Earth" at KBOO since 1971. He has written about and championed Oregon literary figures such as Joaquin Miller, Hazel Hall, Frances Fuller Victor, and many others.

Portland Mayor Sam Adams declared July 1–7, 2010 "Walt Curtis Week."

Books
Angel Pussy (1970)
The Erotic Flying Machine (1970)wr
The Sunflower and Other Earth Poems (1975)
The Mad Bombers Notebook (1975)
The Mad Poems, The Unreasonable Ones (1975)
The Roses of Portland (1974, poetry)
Mala Noche (1977)
Peckerneck Country (1978)
Journey Across America (1979)
Rhymes for Alice Bluelight (1984)
Salmon Song, And Other Wet Poems (1995)
Mala Noche: And Other "Illegal" Adventures (1997)

Films
 Penny Allen : Property (1978)
 Penny Allen : Paydirt (1981)
 Gus van Sant : Mala Noche (1985) as George
 Bill Plympton and Walt Curtis : Walt Curtis, The Peckerneck Poet (1997)
 Sabrina Guitart : Salmon Poet (2009)
 Courtney Fathom Sell : An Afternoon with Walt Curtis (2010)

References

 John Trombold and Peter Donahue (eds.): Reading Portland: The City in Prose (2006).

External links
 
 Oregon's Salmon Poet PowellsBooks.Blog by Matt Love, September 2, 2009 

20th-century American novelists
Beat Generation people
1941 births
Living people
Writers from Portland, Oregon
American gay writers
American gay artists
Poets from Oregon
20th-century American painters
American male painters
21st-century American painters
20th-century American poets
American male novelists
American male poets
20th-century American male writers
Novelists from Oregon
American LGBT poets
American LGBT novelists
20th-century American male artists
Gay poets